Whitney Ashley (born February 18, 1989) is an American athlete whose specialty is the discus throw.

She represented her country at three consecutive Global Championships, in 2013, 2015 and 2016, making the 2015 world final. She competed at the Athletics at the 2016 Summer Olympics - Women's discus throw.

Ashley placed first in Discus at 2016 United States Olympic Trials (track and field) to qualify for Athletics at the 2016 Summer Olympics. Ashley placed 6th at 2017 IAAF Diamond League in the discus and qualified for the 2018 IAAF Diamond League final in Memorial Van Damme (Brussels).

Competition record

Personal bests
Outdoor
Shot put –  (Luzern 2014)
Discus throw –  (Claremont 2015)
Indoor
Shot put –  (Portland 2016)

References

External links

Whitney Ashley University of Kansas Throws Coach profile University of Kansas

1989 births
Living people
World Athletics Championships athletes for the United States
American female discus throwers
People from Moreno Valley, California
San Diego State Aztecs women's track and field athletes
Sportspeople from Riverside County, California
Track and field athletes from California
Cerritos Falcons women's track and field athletes
Athletes (track and field) at the 2016 Summer Olympics
Olympic track and field athletes of the United States
Athletes (track and field) at the 2019 Pan American Games
Pan American Games track and field athletes for the United States
USA Outdoor Track and Field Championships winners
21st-century American women